The 2011–12 Loyola Ramblers men's basketball team represents Loyola University Chicago in the 2011–12 NCAA Division I men's basketball season. Their head coach is Porter Moser. The Ramblers play their home games at the Joseph J. Gentile Arena and are members of the Horizon League.

Roster

Schedule

|-
!colspan=9| Exhibition

|-
!colspan=9| Regular season

|-
!colspan=9|Horizon League tournament

References

Loyola Ramblers
Loyola Ramblers men's basketball seasons
Loyola Ramblers
Loyola Ramblers